The 2014 California State Treasurer election was held on November 4, 2014, to elect the State Treasurer of California. Incumbent Democratic Treasurer Bill Lockyer was term-limited and ineligible to run for re-election to a third term in office.

A primary election was held on June 3, 2014. Under California's nonpartisan blanket primary law, all candidates appear on the same ballot, regardless of party. In the primary, voters may vote for any candidate, regardless of their party affiliation. The top two finishers — regardless of party — advance to the general election in November, even if a candidate manages to receive a majority of the votes cast in the primary election. Washington is the only other state with this system, a so-called "top two primary" (Louisiana has a similar "jungle primary"). Democrat John Chiang and Republican Greg Conlon finished first and second, respectively, and contested the general election, which Chiang won.

Primary election

Candidates

Democratic Party

Declared
 John Chiang, California State Controller

Republican Party

Declared
 Greg Conlon, businessman, Certified Public Accountant, nominee for California State Treasurer in 2002, and nominee for California's 12th congressional district in 2008

Green Party

Declared
 Ellen Brown, attorney and writer

Results

General election

Polling

Results

References

External links
California State Treasurer election, 2014 at Ballotpedia
Campaign contributions at FollowTheMoney.org

Official campaign websites
Ellen Brown for State Treasurer
John Chiang for State Treasurer

State Treasurer

California state treasurer elections
California